Results from Norwegian football in the year 1905.

Cup

Semi-finals

|colspan="3" style="background-color:#97DEFF"|9 September 1905

Final

Class A of local association leagues
The predecessor of a national league competition.

The champions qualified for the 1905 Norwegian Cup.

References

External links
RSSSF Football Archive

 
Seasons in Norwegian football